Ragnheiður Runólfsdóttir (born 19 November 1966) is an Icelandic breaststroke and individual medley swimmer. She competed at the 1988 Summer Olympics and the 1992 Summer Olympics.

References

External links
 

1966 births
Living people
Ragnheidur Runolfsdottir
Ragnheidur Runolfsdottir
Ragnheidur Runolfsdottir
Swimmers at the 1988 Summer Olympics
Swimmers at the 1992 Summer Olympics
Place of birth missing (living people)